DWRQ (105.7 FM), broadcasting as 105.7 Radyo Natin, is a radio station owned by Manila Broadcasting Company and operated by Zambales Mix FM Media Advertising System. Its studios are on the third floor of the Primer Building in Iba, Zambales, Philippines. It is the city's first FM station.

References

Radio stations established in 1997
Radyo Natin Network stations